Penkridge railway station is a station serving the village of Penkridge in Staffordshire, England.

It is situated on the Birmingham branch of the West Coast Main Line. To the north, the line continues towards Stafford.  To the south, the line continues towards the city of Wolverhampton.  The station is operated by London Northwestern Railway, who run all of its train services.

History
The original station was built by the Grand Junction Railway and opened in 1837.  Baron Hatherton allowed trains to run across his land on the condition that two trains a day stopped at Penkridge.  When closure of the station was proposed in 1962, the incumbent Baron Hatherton threatened to withdraw the right to cross his land if the station was closed. Nearby to Penkridge is a former mineral branch line to the nearby village of Huntington. It served a Colliery until the 1980s. The trackbed is a footpath from the Wolverhampton Road to Micklewood Lane near Huntington. The rest of the trackbed is now both agricultural and built on at Huntingdon end by a school.

Services

On Sundays there is an hourly service in each direction, however southbound trains mostly terminate at Birmingham New Street. A number of additional services call during the morning and evening weekday peak periods. One weekday morning southbound service goes to Rugeley Trent Valley via Birmingham, Walsall and Cannock.

Notes

References
Lewis, Roy (1996). Staffordshire Railway Stations on old picture postcards (reprinted 2002). Nottingham: Reflections of a Bygone Age.

External links 

Railway stations in Staffordshire
DfT Category F1 stations
Former London and North Western Railway stations
Railway stations in Great Britain opened in 1837
Railway stations served by West Midlands Trains
railway station